Yedurulanka is a village in I. Polavaram Mandal of East Godavari district, Andhra Pradesh, India.

Former Lok Sabha Speaker Ganti Mohana Chandra Balayogi, shortly G. M. C. Balayogi was born in this village.

Demographics
According to Indian census, 2001, the demographic details of this village is as follows:
 Total Population:  3,020 in 783 Households.
 Male Population:  1,490 and Female Population:  1,530
 Children Under 6-years:  347 (Boys - 168 and Girls - 179)
 Total Literates:  1,971

References

Villages in East Godavari district